The eleventh season of Mad TV, an American sketch comedy series, originally aired in the United States on the Fox Network between September 17, 2005, and May 20, 2006.

Summary
With Spencer Kayden, Ron Pederson, Aries Spears, and Paul Vogt gone from the cast, season eleven saw more changes to the show's cast (Stephanie Weir had also left the show, but was still credited as a cast member. The reason behind this was that Weir agreed to appear in four new episodes' worth of material, which are scattered throughout the season, technically making this her final season). Because of FOX's cast budget cuts, the only new cast members hired were Arden Myrin (who was immediately hired as a repertory member) and featured players Frank Caeti (who resembled Frank Caliendo—a fact that was mentioned and mocked in the season premiere—and did impressions just like him) and Nicole Randall Johnson (marking this the first time in MADtv history to have more than one African-American female cast member, as Gaither was kept). 

With the exception of Michael McDonald and Stephnie Weir, the majority of cast members in this season were born in the 1970s (some of which have birth years after Saturday Night Live'''s premiere in 1975) and were hired in the 2000s, making this the youngest cast in the show's history. This cast was also the most ethnically diverse since the original 1995 cast, with one East Asian male (Lee), one Jewish male (Barinholtz), four white males (McDonald, Caliendo, Caeti, and Barinholtz), two African-American males (Key and Peele), two African-American females (Gaither and Randall Johnson), and four white females (Parker, Myrin, Flanagan, and Weir).

Notable celebrity appearances this season include: Pamela Anderson (who hosted the show's 250th episode, is one of many celebrities who not only hosted Saturday Night Live, but also cameoed on MADtv, and was lampooned by both shows fairly frequently), Jeff Garlin, Alyson Hannigan, Neil Patrick Harris, Jaime Pressly, Michael Rapaport, John Cena, Jeff Probst, Pauly Shore, and Fred Willard

 Opening montage 
The title sequence opens with the Mad TV logo appearing against the skyline of Los Angeles. The theme song, performed by the hip-hop group Heavy D & the Boyz, begins and an announcer introduces each repertory cast member alphabetically, followed by the featured cast. The screen dissolves into three live-action clips of an individual cast member, then the three screens multiply until they fill the entire screen. Then all of the multiple clips flip over and displays another clip of the same cast member. As the multiple clips are reduced to one clip, a still color photo of the cast member is superimposed on the screen with his/her name appearing in caption over the photo. When the last cast member/guest is introduced, the music stops and the title sequence ends with the phrase "You are now watching Mad TV''."

Cast

Repertory cast members
 Ike Barinholtz  (22/22 episodes) 
 Frank Caliendo  (19/22 episodes) 
 Crista Flanagan  (20/22 episodes) 
 Daniele Gaither  (20/22 episodes) 
 Keegan-Michael Key  (22/22 episodes) 
 Bobby Lee  (22/22 episodes) 
 Michael McDonald  (21/22 episodes) 
 Arden Myrin  (19/22 episodes) 
 Nicole Parker  (22/22 episodes) 
 Jordan Peele  (22/22 episodes) 
 Stephnie Weir  (9/22 episodes; last episode: May 6, 2006)

Featured cast members
 Frank Caeti  (16/22 episodes) 
 Nicole Randall Johnson  (13/22 episodes)

Episodes

Home Release 
Season 11 is available on HBO Max and is one of the few seasons (joining seasons 13 and 14) to have no episodes skipped due to copyright issues.

External links 

 Mad TV - Official Website
 

11
2005 American television seasons
2006 American television seasons